Archives of Environmental & Occupational Health is a quarterly peer-reviewed medical journal covering environmental and occupational health. It was established in 1919 as the Journal of Industrial Hygiene, and was renamed in 1960 to the Archives of Environmental Health. It obtained its current name in 2005. It is published by Routledge and the editor-in-chief is Jacqueline Moline. According to the Journal Citation Reports, the journal has a 2014 impact factor of 1.483 (2018), ranking it 129th out of 162 journals in the category "Public, Environmental & Occupational Health".

References

External links

Health Medical Aid

Environmental health journals
Occupational safety and health journals
Routledge academic journals
Publications established in 1919
Quarterly journals
English-language journals